Ronald Bruce Leighton (born 1951) is a former United States district judge of the United States District Court for the Western District of Washington.

Education and career

Born in Stockton, California, Leighton received a Bachelor of Arts degree from Whitworth College in 1973 and a Juris Doctor from the University of California, Hastings College of Law in 1976. He was in private practice in Tacoma, Washington, from 1976 to 2002.

Federal judicial service

On January 23, 2002, Leighton was nominated by President George W. Bush to a seat on the United States District Court for the Western District of Washington vacated by Robert Jensen Bryan. Leighton was confirmed by the United States Senate on November 14, 2002, and received his commission on November 26, 2002. He assumed senior status on February 28, 2019. He retired from active service on August 31, 2020.

Post-judgeship

Since September 1, 2021, Leighton has been of counsel at FAVROS Law.

References

Sources

1951 births
Living people
21st-century American judges
Judges of the United States District Court for the Western District of Washington
People from Stockton, California
United States district court judges appointed by George W. Bush
University of California, Hastings College of the Law alumni
Whitworth University alumni